The 2021 P. League+ Finals was the championship series of the P. League+'s (PLG) 2020–21 season and conclusion of the season's playoffs. The Finals began on May 7 and was early ended on May 15 due to the Taiwanese pandemic restrictions after Game 4. The Taipei Fubon Braves, leading 3–1 in the Finals, was declared the champion after the remaining Finals games were cancelled.

Background

Taipei Fubon Braves

Formosa Taishin Dreamers

Road to the Finals

Regular season series
The Braves won the regular season series 6–2.

Series summary

Game summaries

Game 1

Game 2

Game 3

Game 4

Rosters

Taipei Fubon Braves

Formosa Taishin Dreamers

Player statistics
<noinclude>
Taipei Fubon Braves

Formosa Taishin Dreamers

References

F
P. League+ Finals
2021 in Taiwanese sport
May 2021 sports events in Asia